The Gundu Island is one of the many islands that make up the city of Kochi, Kerala, India. The November 1967 amalgamation order of the Kerala Legislative Assembly declared Gundu Island as part of Kochi.
Gundu is the smallest island around Kochi with an area of  surrounded by coconut trees. The Island lies between Vypin and Vallarpadam islands. The island can be reached from Vypin island only by boat.

Climate
The cool breeze and the calm atmosphere of the island attract a lot of visitors.

Buildings
The only building on the island belongs to a privately owned coir factory that produces ropes and carpets with handmade looms.

See also

 Geography of Kochi

References

Islands of Kerala
Islands of India
Populated places in India